Imre Antal Kocsis (born July 13, 1948) is a Hungarian politician, who served as mayor of Szekszárd between 1990 and 2006.

He was also a member of the National Assembly (MP) from the Alliance of Free Democrats' National List for several months in 1998, when replaced Károly Attila Soós, who resigned on January 1, 1998. After the 1998 parliamentary election, Kocsis lost his mandate.

References

1948 births
Living people
Alliance of Free Democrats politicians
Members of the National Assembly of Hungary (1994–1998)
Mayors of places in Hungary
People from Kiskunhalas